Carolina Herrera Bang (born 21 September 1985), professionally known as Carolina Bang, is a Spanish actress and producer. She is the best known to wider audience for her roles in Álex de la Iglesia's films The Last Circus (2010), As Luck Would Have It (2011), Witching & Bitching (2013) and My Big Night (2015), and also produced his film The Bar (2017). She was nominated for Goya Award for Best New Actress for her performance in The Last Circus.

Career 
In 2005, Bang began her professional career by working in theatre. Throughout 2007 and 2008, she worked on several short films, and then was cast by Álex de la Iglesia for his television series Pluto B.R.B. Nero. Bang starred the series from 2008 to 2009. Meanwhile, she appeared in other popular television series, Paco's Men and The Successful Pells. In 2010, Bang starred the film The Last Circus by Álex de la Iglesia, opposite Antonio de la Torre. As she played a trapeze artist, her role required serious physical preparation. Bang was eventually nominated for Goya Award for Best New Actress at the 25th Goya Awards ceremony.

Bang's credits include roles in Álex de la Iglesia's films As Luck Would Have It (2011), Witching & Bitching (2013) and My Big Night (2015), the acclaimed horror film Shrew's Nest (2014), and television series La tierra de lobos (2011–14) and Web Therapy (2016).

Personal life 
In June 2014, Bang married film director Álex de la Iglesia, whose films she frequently appears in. The pair welcomed their first child and de la Iglesia's third, Julia, in December 2016.

Bang accomplished her studies in both acting and architecture.

Filmography

Awards and nominations

References

External links 
 

1985 births
Living people
People from Santa Cruz de Tenerife
Actresses from the Canary Islands
21st-century Spanish actresses
Spanish female models
Spanish film actresses
Spanish stage actresses
Spanish television actresses
Spanish film producers
Spanish women film producers